The Nothing is the thirteenth studio album by American nu metal band Korn. It was released on September 13, 2019 through Roadrunner and Elektra. The album was produced by Nick Raskulinecz.

Background and recording 
According to the band's lead singer, Jonathan Davis, the title of the album was inspired by a villain from The NeverEnding Story. This is the first album recorded after the deaths of Davis' wife Deven and mother Holly Marie Chavez, which is reflected in the lyrics of songs such as "Finally Free". This affected Davis during the recording of the album, which he treated as a form of personal therapy. Some of his emotional breakdowns were recorded and ended up on the album, most notably towards the end of the intro, "The End Begins". Davis said about the album:

The recording process was unusually long for a Korn record as Davis stated in an interview with Kerrang! that while he would do a typical Korn record in two weeks, he spent around four months recording the vocal tracks for The Nothing.

Following the album's release, the band is scheduled to go on tour co-headlined with Alice in Chains.

Release and promotion 
On June 25, 2019, the band revealed the title of the album, official release date and unveiled its first single, "You'll Never Find Me", and the second, "Cold", on August 2.

On September 6, with the release of the third single "Can You Hear Me", Korn announced a six-episode podcast series. The podcast bears the same title as the album and is a fictional show about a journalist who travels to a small Kansas town to investigate a teenager's disappearance.

On the day of release, September 13, the band played an invite-only special concert. The set list included four tracks from The Nothing, three of which had not been played live previously.

Critical reception 

The Nothing received acclaim from music critics. At Metacritic, which assigns a normalised rating out of 100 to reviews from mainstream critics, the album has an average score of 83 out of 100 based on six reviews, indicating "universal acclaim". It is also the highest Metacritic rating out of all Korn's albums rated on the website. AllMusic gave the album a positive review saying, "Over atmospheric NIN-like piano and towering drums, he exposes his guilt-stricken soul in a final confessional. As the swell fades away, he weeps, "I failed, I failed." It's one of the saddest moments in their catalog, a low point that ironically elevates this album to one of their strongest statements. Korn have always excelled at pain, but with The Nothing, this is the most authentic it's ever been."

Loudwire named it one of the 50 best metal albums of 2019.

Commercial performance 
The Nothing debuted at number eight on the US Billboard 200 with 33,000 album-equivalent units, of which 29,000 were pure album sales. It is Korn's 14th US top-10 album. As of the end of 2020, the album has sold over 80,000 traditional copies in the US.

Track listing

Personnel 

Korn
 Jonathan Davis – lead vocals, bagpipes
 James "Munky" Shaffer – guitars
 Brian "Head" Welch – guitars
 Reginald "Fieldy" Arvizu – bass
 Ray Luzier – drums

Additional personnel
 Nick Raskulinecz – producer
 David "Beno" Benveniste – executive producer
 Nick "Sluggo" Suddarth – additional production on "Can You Hear Me"
 Josh Wilbur – mixing
 Ted Jensen – mastering
 Nathan Yarborough – engineering
 Chris Collier – additional engineering
 Jim Monti – additional engineering
 Matt Wallace – additional engineering
 Guilherme Coelho – programming
 Nathan Davis – programming
 Tiago Nuñez – programming
 Jules Venturini – programming

Charts

Weekly charts

Year-end charts

References 

2019 albums
Korn albums
Roadrunner Records albums
Albums produced by Nick Raskulinecz